James Sinclair,  (May 26, 1908 – February 7, 1984) was a Canadian politician and businessman. He was the maternal grandfather of current Canadian Prime Minister Justin Trudeau.

Early life
Sinclair was born in Crossroads, Grange, Banffshire, Scotland, the son of James George Sinclair (March 9, 1879; Wick, Scotland – March 18, 1962; Vancouver) and Betsy Sinclair née Ross (December 12, 1878; Evanton, Scotland – September 18, 1959; Vancouver). He moved to Vancouver with his family in 1911 where his father, who had already immigrated a year earlier, was among the founders of Vancouver Technical Secondary School, the area's first vocational school, and served as the school's second principal from 1930 until 1944. Sinclair studied engineering at the University of British Columbia and was awarded a Rhodes scholarship in 1928 to study mathematics at St John's College, in the University of Oxford. He also studied mathematical physics at Princeton University. During World War II, he served with the Royal Canadian Air Force in North Africa, Malta, and Sicily as a squadron leader.

Career 
He was first elected to the House of Commons of Canada representing the riding of Vancouver North in the 1940 federal election. A Liberal, he was re-elected in 1945 in the riding of Vancouver North, and in 1949, 1953, and 1957 in the riding of Coast-Capilano. He was defeated in the 1958 federal election. From 1949 to 1952, he was the Parliamentary Assistant to the Minister of Finance. From 1952 to 1957, he was the Minister of Fisheries.

From 1958 to 1960, he was the President of Fisheries Association of British Columbia. From 1960 to 1970, he was president and Chairman of Lafarge Cement of North America. He was also a director of the Bank of Montreal and of Canadian Industries limited. He took part in the economic mission headed by Charles Drury with people such as Paul Desmarais, Yves Dubé, Marcel Faribeault to France in June 1966. From 1970 to 1973 he was Deputy Chairman of Canada Cement Lafarge Limited. In 1978, according to testimony in the trial of four murdered teenagers, their killings were part of a failed attempted scheme to kidnap four prominent Vancouver-area families including James Sinclair's.

Personal life 
Sinclair was married in Saint Stephen's Anglican Church, West Vancouver on November 2, 1940 to Doris Kathleen Bernard (February 11, 1920; Penticton, British Columbia – March 29, 2012; Saanich, British Columbia). They had of five daughters. His fourth daughter was Margaret Joan Trudeau née Sinclair, one-time wife of the 15th Canadian Prime Minister Pierre Trudeau and mother of 23rd and current Canadian Prime Minister Justin Trudeau, Alexandre Trudeau and Michel Trudeau. Many, including Jean Chrétien and Justin Trudeau himself, have noted the family resemblance in physical appearance between Sinclair and Justin Trudeau. Sinclair is also the namesake of both Justin Trudeau (whose middle name is James) and Xavier James Trudeau, son of Justin Trudeau and Sophie Grégoire Trudeau.

He died in 1984 of a myocardial infarction at his home in West Vancouver.

The Sinclair Centre, a shopping complex in downtown Vancouver, is named after him.

References

External links

  

|-

1908 births
1984 deaths
Alumni of St John's College, Oxford
Businesspeople from Vancouver
20th-century Canadian businesspeople
Canadian Rhodes Scholars
Liberal Party of Canada MPs
Members of the House of Commons of Canada from British Columbia
Members of the King's Privy Council for Canada
People from Banff, Aberdeenshire
Politicians from Vancouver
Princeton University alumni
British emigrants to Canada
University of British Columbia Faculty of Applied Science alumni
Trudeau political family
Royal Canadian Air Force officers
Royal Canadian Air Force personnel of World War II